Askari (also Romanized as Askari; also known as ‘Asgarī and ‘Asgarī) is a village in Akhand Rural District, Central District, Asaluyeh County, Bushehr Province, Iran. At the 2006 census, its population was 626, in 93 families.

References 

Populated places in Asaluyeh County